In 2002, Elton John and Billy Joel continued on their success Face to Face concert series.

The tour started in the winter of 2002 and continued until the fall of the same year. The concerts scheduled for 11 March through 6 April were cancelled and then postponed until the fall of the same year due to Joel's ill health.

Joel stated in 2012 that he would no longer tour with Elton because it restrains his setlists.

Tour dates

Setlists

References

External links

 Information Site with Tour Dates

2002 concert tours
Billy Joel concert tours
Co-headlining concert tours
Elton John concert tours